Harm Haijo Apotheker (born 5 June 1950, Loppersum) is a Dutch politician for the Democraten 66 party. He was mayor of several Dutch townships, including Leeuwarden. From 1998 to 1999 Apotheker was Minister of Agriculture in the Second Kok cabinet, but he couldn't find his way in the national political arena. He resigned in 1999 and returned to his familiar position as mayor in various townships.

Apotheker became acting mayor of Sneek in 2010, which went up in the new township of Súdwest-Fryslân in 2011. As mayor of that township, he blindly signed a forged multimillion-euro contract for a residential construction project in Sneek. This caused the township to pay 7 million euro more than expected.

References

1950 births
Living people
20th-century Dutch politicians
21st-century Dutch politicians
Aldermen in Groningen (province)
Democrats 66 politicians
Dutch sociologists
Mayors of Leeuwarden
Mayors in Friesland
People from Noardeast-Fryslân
People from Sneek
Mayors in Overijssel
People from Steenwijkerland
People from Súdwest-Fryslân
Mayors in Groningen (province)
People from Veendam
People from Waadhoeke
Ministers of Agriculture of the Netherlands
Municipal councillors in Groningen (province)
People from Loppersum
Protestant Church Christians from the Netherlands
University of Groningen alumni